57th meridian may refer to:

57th meridian east, a line of longitude east of the Greenwich Meridian
57th meridian west, a line of longitude west of the Greenwich Meridian